Sherwood Creek is a creek in Mason County, Washington fed by Mason Lake.  It runs through the small town of Allyn, Washington, before releasing into the Case Inlet at the base of the Kitsap Peninsula.

Geography

Source: 
Mouth: 
Sherwood Creek varies widely in its geography. In one section of the creek it is one inch deep with a rocky bed, and then quickly drops to three feet deep with a sandy bed. Seasonally this can drop to ten feet.

The creek is fed by Mason Lake, which in turn is fed by another creek. Sherwood Creek has one known tributary.

The creek is often subject to seasonal floods - usually in fall and winter when rainfall is heavier. The creek is also ridden with small to large pools of deep, slow moving water. In the sand bottom areas, sometimes the walls of the creek are small cliffs, dropping straight down into the creek. 

The creek itself lies within its own valley, which is very wide and steep, thus making the creek hard to access. In some places it is so steep, it could be considered a cliff. When attempting to access the creek, never go alone and bring rope. It can be very dangerous because when walking in the sand bottom areas, the water becomes murky, making it impossible to see the bottom. When the water is murky, there are many dangers present, such as swift currents, sudden drop offs (which the creek is greatly composed of), etc. 

Later down in the creek, houses line its side for about a mile or two. But before that, it slows and splits, and then rejoins in what is known as Mill Pond.

Mill Pond is a large reservoir of water, not much is known about it. It is affected by the tide as it is close to the outlet of the creek. It is believed to have been created in the 1950s by Native Americans within the area for fishing. But it is now inaccessible to the public. It is scarcely viewable, though the best view is at a residence along Washington State Route 3. There, you can see the small lake (referred to as a pond) and how the creek used to be. You can see a dark area running through the center of it, which is where the creek used to be. A way to tell if your near it, is when on Route 3, you will see a small lake to your left if heading towards Shelton, Washington. This lake is known as Catfish Lake.

History
The town of Allyn was settled in 1853, but it would not be officially founded until 1889. By 1890, Allyn had become a large lumber exporter, with railways going along the creek. This meant that Allyn had to have its own sawmill. The sawmill was set at the creek. The operator of the mill was Joe Sherwood, who died in an accident at the mill in 1873. After Sherwood's death, they named Sherwood Creek after him. Later, in the 1950s, it is believed that Mill Pond was formed. The local Indian tribe created it, most likely for fishing. Currently, a group known as the ASEG (Allyn Salmon Enhancement Group) is working on protecting and helping the salmon in the creek. They do numerous projects at the creek, from the delta to the source at Mason Lake. Currently, there is a Naval railway running alongside the unpopulated side of the creek's valley. The railway, at a point, crosses over the creek near its source. You can also find ruins from an old logging site and possible parts of the old State Route 3. These are located on a small hidden road near a residence.

Wildlife
The whole creek is full of life. During October through November, salmon swim up the creek in order to reproduce. Crayfish are a rare sight, but do live in the creek. On land, deer, coyotes, bears, chipmunks, squirrels, rabbits, and possibly Bigfoot plus numerous types of birds, flora, fungi, rodents and insects are all present. At night, spiders come out to hunt, it seemingly rains spiders from the trees. Also at night, other creatures come out to hunt, such as the coyotes, which are a hazard to other animals and people. They come up to peoples' houses to try to get their animals, which can be a nuisance. There are also many beavers within the creek, and their neatly chewed sticks can be found all around.

References

Rivers of Mason County, Washington
Rivers of Washington (state)